Igor Tymonyuk (born 31 March 1994) is a Belarusian professional footballer who plays for Dinamo Brest.

Honours
Dinamo Brest
Belarusian Cup winner: 2016–17

References

External links 
 
 
 Profile at Dinamo Brest website 

1994 births
Living people
Sportspeople from Brest, Belarus
Belarusian footballers
Association football midfielders
Belarusian expatriate footballers
Expatriate footballers in Uzbekistan
FC Dynamo Brest players
FK Mash'al Mubarek players
FC Slavia Mozyr players
FC Rukh Brest players